The South Florida Water Management District (SFWMD) is a regional governmental district that oversees water resources from Orlando to the Florida Keys. The mission of the SFWMD is to manage and protect water resources by balancing and improving water quality, flood control, natural systems and water supply, covering 16 counties in Central and Southern Florida. It is the largest water management district in the state, managing water needs for 7.7 million residents. A key initiative is the restoration of America's Everglades – the largest environmental restoration project in the nation's history. The District is also working to improve the Kissimmee River and its floodplain, Lake Okeechobee and South Florida's coastal estuaries.

The Governing Board consists of Chauncey Goss, Scott Wagner, Ron Bergeron Sr, Carlos E. Martinez, Cheryl Meads, Charlette Roman, Jay Steinle, and Jacqui Thurlow-Lippisch.

History
In 1947, after years of drought, the state was deluged by rainfall averaging 100 inches along the lower east coast, almost twice the norm. Much of the ground was saturated when two hurricanes hit the state late in the year, and flooding throughout the region was devastating. Florida asked the federal government for a master plan to tame nature's excesses. In 1948, the U.S. Congress adopted legislation creating the Central and Southern Florida (C&SF) Project, the largest civil works project in the country. Construction began the next year and continued over 20 years as the U.S. Army Corps of Engineers built the massive flood control plumbing system stretching from just south of Orlando to Florida Bay.

In 1949, the Florida Legislature created the Central and Southern Florida Flood Control District, the predecessor to the South Florida Water Management District, to manage the C&SF Project. In 1972, with the Florida Water Resources Act (Chapter 373), the state created five water management districts, with expanded responsibilities for regional water resource management and environmental protection. In 1976, voters approved a constitutional amendment giving the districts the authority to levy property taxes to help fund these activities. All five of the state's water management districts' boundaries are determined by watersheds and other natural, hydrologic and geographic features.  Today, the South Florida Water Management District is the oldest and largest of the state's five water management districts.

A book detailing the first forty years of the South Florida Water Management District titled "Into the Fifth Decade" was written by Thomas E. Huser.

In the year 2000, the Comprehensive Everglades Restoration Plan began to undo some ecosystem damage caused by the C&SF Project.

Local Sponsor
The SFWMD is the designated local sponsor for the Central and Southern Florida Flood Control Project (C&SF Project) —known as the Flood Control Act of 1948—pursuant to  § 373.103(2), Florida Statutes.

Operations
The regional water management system – with nearly 2,000 miles of canals and more than 2,800 miles of levees/berms, 69 pump stations, 645 water control structures and more than 700 culverts – helps to protect regional water supplies and provide flood control.

Weather extremes dramatically affect South Florida's water supply and flood protection actions. In response, the District actively operates and maintains the water management system, promotes water conservation and works with communities to develop alternative water supplies.

The management is currently working to restore water flow to the Everglades.

Programs
The South Florida Water Management District manages many programs, including the controversial Water Farming program, which results in minimal returns for taxpayers and would be much cheaper on state owned land.

Public areas
Many of the lands protected by the District are open to the public for recreational use.  
 Allapattah Flats 
 Arthur R. Marshall Loxahatchee National Wildlife Refuge 
 Atlantic Ridge Preserve State Park in Martin County
 Blind Creek in St. Lucie County
 Catfish Creek (Florida) in Polk County
 Chandler Slough in Okeechobee County
 Corkscrew Regional Ecosystem Watershed 
 Cornwell Marsh 
 DuPuis Management Area 
 Gordy Road Recreation Area 
 Halpatiokee Regional Park in Martin County
 Harold A. Campbell Public Use Area 
 Hickory Hammock Wildlife Management Area 
 Hungryland Wildlife and Environmental Area 
 Intercession City 
 KICCO 
 Kissimmee Prairie Preserve State Park 
 Lake Kissimmee - Bird Island, Drasdo, Gardner-Cobb Marsh, Lightsey, Strum Island
 Lake Marion Creek Wildlife Management Area
 Lake Russell (Florida) in Osceola County
 Lower Reedy Creek 
 Loxahatchee River/Cypress Creek Management Area 
 Loxahatchee Slough Natural Area
 MICCO Landing 
 Miller/Wild Property 
 No Name Slough 
 North Fork St. Lucie River 
 Okaloacoochee Slough Wildlife Management Area 
 Pal-Mar East/Nine Gems 
 Paradise Run 
 Queen's Island (Florida) in St. Lucie County
 Reedy Creek (Florida) 
 Riverbend Park 
 Rough Island North and South
 Shingle Creek Management Area 
 Six Mile Cypress Slough Preserve in Lee County
 Southern Glades Wildlife and Environmental Area 
 Spruce Bluff in St. Lucie County
 Starvation Slough 
 SUMICA in Polk County
 Taylor Creek (Florida) 
 Ten Mile Creek (Florida)
 Three Scrub Sites 
 Upper Reedy Creek

See also
Northwest Florida Water Management District
St. Johns River Water Management District
Southwest Florida Water Management District
Suwannee River Water Management District

References

External links
Official Website

Water management authorities in the United States
State agencies of Florida
1972 establishments in Florida
Government agencies established in 1972